In Greek mythology, Echius (Ancient Greek: Ἐχίοιο or Ἐχίον) may refer to two different men who both participated in the Trojan War:

 Echius, an Achaean warrior who was slain by the Trojan prince Polites, son of King Priam. He was the father of Mecisteus, another Greek soldier during the siege of Troy.
 Echius, a Lycian warrior who followed their commander, Sarpedon, in the defense of Ilium. He was killed by Patroclus.

Notes

References 

 Homer, The Iliad with an English Translation by A.T. Murray, Ph.D. in two volumes. Cambridge, MA., Harvard University Press; London, William Heinemann, Ltd. 1924. . Online version at the Perseus Digital Library.
 Homer, Homeri Opera in five volumes. Oxford, Oxford University Press. 1920. . Greek text available at the Perseus Digital Library.

Achaeans (Homer)
Trojans